John Thomson Mason Jr. (May 9, 1815 – March 28, 1873) was a U.S. Congressman from Maryland, representing the sixth district from 1841 to 1843.

Early life and education
Born at the Montpelier estate near Hagerstown, Maryland, Mason was educated by a private tutor and graduated from Princeton College in 1836.  He studied law, was admitted to the bar, and commenced practice in Hagerstown in 1838.

Political career
Mason later served as a member of the Maryland House of Delegates in 1838 and 1839, and was elected as a Democrat to the Twenty-seventh Congress, serving one term from March 4, 1841 to March 3, 1843.  He was a judge of the Maryland Court of Appeals from 1851 to 1857, and afterwards a collector of customs at Baltimore, Maryland, from 1857 to 1861.  He moved to Annapolis, Maryland, and served as Secretary of State of Maryland from 1872 until his death in 1873.

Death and interment
Mason died on March 28, 1873 in Elkton, Maryland at age 57. He is interred in Rose Hill Cemetery (Maryland) in Hagerstown, Maryland.

Marriage and children
Mason married Margaret Augusta Cowan in Alleghany City, Pennsylvania on December 14, 1842. The couple had  four children:

Louise Gilmer Mason Terry (February 12, 1844–September 26, 1921)
William Temple Thomson Mason (December 12, 1845–April 5, 1847)
Elizabeth Mason Porter (born March 28, 1848)
John Thomson Mason (born January 3, 1850)

Relations
John Thomson Mason Jr. was a grandnephew of George Mason (1725–1792); grandson of Thomson Mason (1733–1785); nephew of Stevens Thomson Mason (1760–1803); son of John Thomson Mason (1765–1824) and Elizabeth Beltzhoover Mason (1781–1836); second cousin of Thomson Francis Mason (1785–1838); first cousin of Armistead Thomson Mason (1787–1819), John Thomson Mason (1787–1850), and James Murray Mason (1798–1871); and first cousin once removed of Stevens Thomson Mason (1811–1843).

References

1815 births
1873 deaths
19th-century American Episcopalians
American people of English descent
Burials at Rose Hill Cemetery (Hagerstown, Maryland)
Mason family
Judges of the Maryland Court of Appeals
Maryland lawyers
Democratic Party members of the Maryland House of Delegates
Politicians from Hagerstown, Maryland
People from Washington County, Maryland
Princeton University alumni
Secretaries of State of Maryland
Democratic Party members of the United States House of Representatives from Maryland
19th-century American politicians